Al-Ain Oasis ("Oasis of the Spring") is the largest oasis in the city of Al Ain, within the Eastern Region of the Emirate of Abu Dhabi, the United Arab Emirates.

Geography
It is located in Al-Mutawa'a District in central Al-Ain, and east of Al-Jahili District. The border between Al-Ain City and the Omani town of Al Buraimi is to the northwest. Adjacent to the oasis are Al Ain National Museum and Sultan Bin Zayed Fort to the east, and Al Ain Palace Museum to the west. To south is Al Ain Sports Club and Jabal Al-Naqfah, a ridge of Jebel Hafeet. To the southwest are Al Ain Etisalat Building and the Oasis Hospital. Al Ain Oasis is also known as Al-Jahily Falaj. It was built by Zayed the Grand.

Falaj

The oasis is known for its underground irrigation system (falaj or qanāt), which brings water from boreholes to water farms and palm trees. The falaj irrigation is an ancient system dating back thousands of years and is used widely in Oman, UAE, India, Iran, and other countries.

See also
 Bidaa Bint Saud
 Hili Archaeological Park
 List of Ancient Settlements in the UAE
 List of cultural property of national significance in the United Arab Emirates
 List of tourist attractions in the United Arab Emirates
 Qattara Oasis
 Tawam (region)

References

External links

 A Ain Oasis Visit Abu Dhabi

Oases of Al Ain